Robert Johnstone "Bluey" McClure (5 June 1925 – 17 July 2003) was an Australian rules footballer who played with Essendon in the VFL.

A ruckman, McClure served in the navy during World War II prior to joining Essendon. He became a key component in a successful Essendon side, winning premierships in 1946, 1949 and 1950. A knee injury forced him to retire during the 1951 season.

References

External links

Profile at Essendonfc.com
Statistics at Essendonfc.com

1925 births
2003 deaths
Australian rules footballers from Victoria (Australia)
Essendon Football Club players
Essendon Football Club Premiership players
Three-time VFL/AFL Premiership players